The 1941 Colorado A&M Aggies football team represented Colorado State College of Agriculture and Mechanic Arts in the Mountain States Conference (MSC) during the 1941 college football season.  In their 31st season under head coach Harry W. Hughes, the Aggies compiled a 4–2–1 record (3–2–1 against MSC opponents), tied for fourth place in the MSC, and outscored opponents by a total of 109 to 77.

Schedule

References

Colorado AandM
Colorado State Rams football seasons
Colorado AandM Aggies football